Morunasaurus annularis, known commonly as the ringed manticore or the ringed spinytail iguana, is a species of lizard in the family Hoplocercidae. The species is endemic to northwestern South America. Little is known of its lifestyle.

Geographic range
M. annularis is found in southern Colombia and Ecuador.

Reproduction
M. annularis is oviparous.

References

External links
Ringed spinytail iguana skull and information at Digimorph.org
Pazmiño Otamendi G (1901). Morunasaurus annularis.  In: Torres-Carvajal O, Salazar-Valenzuela D, Merino-Viteri A (editors). ReptiliaWebEcuador. Version 2013.0. Museo de Zoología QCAZ, Pontificia Universidad Católica del Ecuador (in Spanish).

Further reading
Boulenger GA (1885). Catalogue of the Lizards in the British Museum (Natural History). Second Edition. Volume II. Iguanidæ ... London: Trustees of the British Museum (Natural History). (Taylor and Francis, printers). xiii + 497 pp. + Plates I-XXIV. (Hoplocercus annularis, pp. 200–201).
O'Shaughnessy AWE (1881). "An Account of the Collection of Lizards made by Mr. Buckley in Ecuador, and now in the British Museum, with Descriptions of the new Species". Proc. Zool. Soc. London 1881: 227-245 + Plates XXII-XXV. (Hoplocercus annularis, new species, pp. 244-245 + Plate XXV, figure 2).

Morunasaurus
Reptiles of Colombia
Reptiles of Ecuador
Reptiles described in 1881
Taxa named by Arthur William Edgar O'Shaughnessy